Destro (literally Right (opposite of left)) is an Italian surname. Notable people with the surname include:

Elizabeth Destro, American film producer
Giustina Destro (born 1945), Italian politician and entrepreneur
Mattia Destro (born 1991), Italian footballer
Robert Destro, American attorney, academic, and government official

See also
Destro, a fictional character in the G.I. Joe universe
Destroyer, a type of warship

Surnames
Surnames of Italian origin
Italian-language surnames